Les Milles is a village, part of the commune of Aix-en-Provence, in southern France.

On the territory of the village Camp des Milles was opened in September 1939 in a former tile factory. Originally a French internment camp to detain undesirable aliens, it was later used  as a transit camp for Jews to be deported to extermination camps, mainly Auschwitz.

See also

 Camp des Milles

Aix-en-Provence
Villages in Provence-Alpes-Côte d'Azur